Anatoly Anatolyevich Neratov (Russian: Анатолий Анатольевич Нератов) (2 October 1863 in Russia – 10 April 1938 in Villejuif, France) was a Russian diplomat and an official of the Russian foreign ministry. He was deputy to five foreign ministers of the Tsarist and the Provisional Government.

After finishing the Imperial Lyceum in Tsarskoye Selo Neratov joined the Foreign service around 1890. Between 1906 and 1910 he was vice-director of the 1st department of the Russian foreign ministry, from 1910 on until 1917 he then was Permanent Under Secretary of State resp. Deputy Minister of Foreign Affairs. Although Neratov has never been abroad during his long service he temporarily became acting foreign minister four times:

from March to December 1911 (i. e. during Persian Revolution, Moroccan Crisis and Tripolitanian War) when Sergei Dmitryevich Sazonov fell ill,
in November/December 1916 (during World War I) after Boris Vladimirovich Stürmer was dismissed and before Nikolai Nikolayevich Pokrovsky was appointed (in December Neratov became a member of the State Council, too)
in February/March 1917 (after the February Revolution) when Pokrovsky resigned and before Pavel Nikolayevich Milyukov was appointed
in October/November 1917 (following the October Revolution) when Mikhail Ivanovich Tereshchenko was arrested temporarily

Leon Trotsky, the new People's Commissar for Foreign Affairs, asked Neratov to subordinate to the Council of People's Commissars and to hand over the secret documents from the diplomatic archives of the foreign ministry. Neratov refused and was eventually deposed and replaced by Ivan Zalkind in November 1917. The secret documents were confiscated and published, however, in January 1918 Neratov claimed that some of these published documents were nothing more than insignificant notices or even forgeries. During the Russian Civil War Nerotov advised the "White" movement – first Anton Ivanovich Denikin, then, from 1920, Denikin's successor Pyotr Nikolayevich Wrangel. Wrangel finally sent Neratov as his ambassador to Istanbul to get support from the Entente. At the end of the Turkish War of Independence, when the Entente gave Istanbul back to the Turks, Neratov fled to France.

Sources 

1863 births
1938 deaths
Foreign ministers of the Russian Empire
Foreign ministers of Russia
Russian people of World War I
Tsarskoye Selo Lyceum alumni
Emigrants from the Russian Empire to France
Russian anti-communists